St Bartholomew's Church, Allen's Cross is a parish church in the Church of England in Birmingham.

History

The foundation stone for the new church was laid on 21 April 1937 by Councillor R. Canning J.P. It took its dedication from St Bartholomew’s Church, Birmingham which was closed in 1937 because of its failing structure.

It was designed in a Romanesque style to designs by the architect Samuel Nathaniel Cooke and consecrated by the Bishop of Birmingham Ernest Barnes on 7 May 1938.

In 1998 the church suffered an arson attack, and in 2006 the building was demolished. The parish is worshipping in temporary premises until a replacement church can be constructed.

Organ

The church contained an organ dating from 1888 by Walter James Bird which had originally been installed in St Bartholomew’s Church, Birmingham. It was adapted for installation in this church in 1938. A specification of the organ can be found on the National Pipe Organ Register. The organ was lost in the arson attack of 1998.

References

Church of England church buildings in Birmingham, West Midlands
Churches completed in 1938
Religious buildings and structures in the United Kingdom destroyed by arson
Bartholomew